Karen Kovacik is a former poet laureate of the American state of Indiana from 2011 until 2013. George Kalamaras succeeded her.

References

Year of birth missing (living people)
Living people
American women poets
Writers from Indiana
Poets Laureate of Indiana
21st-century American women